Bizhou may refer to:

Modern locations
 Bizhou, Heilongjiang, a town in Xinlin District, Da Hinggan Ling Prefecture, Heilongjiang, China
 Bizhou, Jiangxi, a town in Suichuan County
 Bizhou Village, a village in Weishan, Xinhua County

Historical prefectures
Bizhou, the name of Tangzhou during the rules of Later Liang, Later Tang and Later Jin in early 10th century

See also
Bi (disambiguation)